Samuel Bates may refer to:
 Samuel Penniman Bates (1827–1902) was an American educator, author, and historian
 Samuel Bates (cricketer) (1890–1916), English cricketer

See also
 Sam Bates (disambiguation)